Sophie Henriette Gertrud Taeuber-Arp (19 January 1889 – 13 January 1943) was a Swiss artist, painter, sculptor, textile designer, furniture and interior designer, architect, and dancer.

Born in 1889 in Davos, and raised in Trogen, Switzerland, she attended a trade school in St. Gallen and, later, art schools in Germany, before moving back to Switzerland during the First World War. At an exhibition in 1915, she met for the first time the German-French artist Hans/Jean Arp, whom she married shortly after. It was during these years that they became associated with the Dada movement, which emerged in 1916, and Taeuber-Arp's most famous works – Dada Head (Tête Dada; 1920) – date from these years. They moved to France in 1926, where they stayed until the invasion of France during the Second World War, at the event of which they went back to Switzerland. In 1943, she died in an accident with a leaking gas stove.

Despite being overlooked since her death, she is considered one of the most important artists of concrete art and geometric abstraction of the 20th century.

Early life
Born in Davos, Switzerland, Sophie Henriette Gertrud Taeuber was the fifth child of Prussian pharmacist Emil Taeuber and Swiss Sophie Taeuber-Krüsi, from Gais in Appenzell Ausserrhoden, Switzerland. Her parents operated a pharmacy in Davos until her father died of tuberculosis when she was two years old, after which the family moved to Trogen, where her mother opened a pension. She was taught to sew by her mother.

She studied textile design at the trade school (Gewerbeschule, today School of Applied Arts) in St. Gallen (1906–1910). She then moved on to the workshop of Wilhelm von Debschitz at his school in Munich, where she studied in 1911 and again in 1913; in between, she studied for a year at the School of Arts and Crafts (Kunstgewerbeschule) in Hamburg. In 1914, due to World War One, she returned to Switzerland. She joined the Schweizerischer Werkbund in 1915. In the same year, she attended the Laban School of Dance in Zurich, and in the summer she joined the artist colony of Monte Verita in Ascona; in 1917, she danced with Suzanne Perrottet, Mary Wigman and others at the Sun Festival organised by Laban in Ascona. From 1916 to 1929, Taeuber was an instructor at Zürich Kunstgewerbeschule in Switzerland, teaching embroidery and design classes.

Dada

In 1915, at an exhibition at the Tanner Gallery, she met the Dada artist Jean "Hans" Arp, who had moved to Zurich in 1915 to avoid being drafted by the German Army during the First World War. They were to collaborate on numerous joint projects until her death in 1943. They married in 1922 and she changed her last name to Taeuber-Arp.

Taeuber-Arp taught weaving and other textile arts at the Kunstgewerbeschule Zürich (now Zurich University of the Arts) from 1916 to 1929. Her textile and graphic works from around 1916 through the 1920s are among the earliest Constructivist works, along with those of Piet Mondrian and Kasimir Malevich. These sophisticated geometric abstractions reflect a subtle understanding of the interplay between colour and form.

During this period, she was involved in the Zürich Dada movement, which centred on the Cabaret Voltaire. She took part in Dada-inspired performances as a dancer, choreographer, and puppeteer, and she designed puppets, costumes and sets for performances at the Cabaret Voltaire as well as for other Swiss and French theatres. At the opening of the Galerie Dada in 1917, she danced to poetry by Hugo Ball while wearing a shamanic mask by Marcel Janco. A year later, she was a co-signer of the Zurich Dada Manifesto. As both a dancer and painter, Taeuber was able to incorporate Dada in her movement for dancing and was described as obscure and awkward.

She also made a number of sculptural works, such as a set of abstract "Dada Heads" of turned polychromed wood. With their witty resemblance to the ubiquitous small stands used by hatmakers, they typified her elegant synthesis of the fine and applied arts.

Taeuber-Arp was also a close friend and contemporary of the French-Romanian avant-garde poet, essayist, and artist, Tristan Tzara, one of the central figures of the Dada movement. In 1920, Tzara solicited over four dozen Dadaist artists, among which were Taeuber-Arp, Jean Arp, Jean Cocteau, Marcel Duchamp, and Hannah Höch. Tzara planned to use the contributed text and images to create an anthology of Dada work entitled Dadaglobe. A worldwide release of 10,000 copies was planned, but the project was abandoned when its main backer, Francis Picabia, distanced himself from Tzara in 1921.

The Guardian called her a "radical artist who brought joy to the dada". Though dada has been described as an early form of subversive pop culture likened by some to the punk subculture, critics have said that Taeuber's artworks were not angry but "joyous abstractions", created as part of a movement that has been called revolutionary for its influence challenging the established conventions of art by "playing with blocks and blobs of colour, moving them around randomly, letting patterns emerge by chance, in a kind of visual jazz."

France

In 1926 Taeuber-Arp and Jean Arp moved to Strasbourg, where both took up French citizenship; after which they divided their time between Strasbourg and Paris. There Taeuber-Arp received numerous commissions for interior design projects; for example, she was commissioned to create a radically Constructivist interior for the Café de l'Aubette – a project on which Jean Arp and de Stijl artist Theo van Doesburg eventually joined her as collaborators. In 1927 she co-authored a book entitled Welly Lowell with Blanche Gauchet.

From the late 1920s, she lived mainly in Paris and continued experimenting with design. The couple became French citizens in 1926 and in 1928 they moved to Meudon/Val-Fleury, outside Paris, where she designed their new house and some of its furnishings.

In the 1930s, she was a member of the group Cercle et Carré, founded by Michel Seuphor and Joaquín Torres García as a standard-bearer of non-figurative art, and its successor, the Abstraction-Création group (1931–34). Taeuber-Arp also provided the cover art for the February 1933 issue of Eugene Jolas's avant-garde little magazine, transition.

Sophie Taeuber-Arp explored the circle which represented the cosmic metaphor, the form that contains all others. She referred to this period as “ping pictures”.

She appears to be the first artist to use polka dots in fine art with works such as Dynamic Circles, 1934, in the footsteps of Kazimir Malevich and his Black Circle (1915).

Later in the decade she founded a Constructivist review, Plastique (Plastic) in Paris. Her circle of friends included the artists Sonia Delaunay, Robert Delaunay, Wassily Kandinsky, Joan Miró, and Marcel Duchamp. She was also a member of Allianz, a union of Swiss painters, from 1937 to 1943. In 1940, Taeuber-Arp and Arp fled Paris ahead of the Nazi occupation and moved to Grasse in Vichy France, where they created an art colony with Sonia Delaunay, Alberto Magnelli, and other artists. At the end of 1942, they fled to Switzerland.

Death and legacy
In early 1943, Taeuber-Arp missed the last tram home one night and slept in a snow-covered summer house. She died there of accidental carbon monoxide poisoning caused by an incorrectly operated stove at the house of Max Bill.

Wassily Kandinsky said: "Sophie Taeuber-Arp expressed herself by means of the 'colored relief,' especially in the last years of her life, using almost exclusively the simplest forms, geometric forms. The forms, by their sobriety, their silence, their way of being sufficient unto themselves, invite the hand, if it is skillful, to use the language that is suitable to it and which is often only a whisper; but often too the whisper is more expressive, more convincing, more persuasive, than the 'loud voice' that here and there lets itself burst out."

In 2014, at the Danser sa vie dance and art exhibition at the Centre Georges Pompidou in France, a photograph was displayed of Taeuber-Arp dancing in a highly stylized mask and costume at the Cabaret Voltaire in 1917.

Taeuber-Arp was the only woman on the eighth series of Swiss banknotes; her portrait was on the 50-franc note from 1995 to 2016.

A museum honouring Taeuber-Arp and Jean Arp opened in 2007 in a section of the Rolandseck railway station in Germany, re-designed by Richard Meier. The video work "Sophie Taeuber-Arp's Vanishing Lines" (2015) by new media artist Myriam Thyes from Switzerland is about her "Lignes" drawings, segmented circles intersected by lines.

On 19 January 2016, Google created a Google Doodle for Taeuber-Arp to commemorate her 127th birthday. The doodle was made by Mark Holmes.

Exhibitions
Taeuber-Arp took part in numerous exhibitions. For example, she was included in the first Carré exhibition at the Galeries 23 (Paris) in 1930, along with other notable early 20th-century modernists. In 1943, Taeuber-Arp was included in Peggy Guggenheim's show Exhibition by 31 Women at the Art of This Century gallery in New York. Many museums around the world have her work in their collections, but in the public consciousness her reputation lagged for many years behind that of her more famous husband. Sophie Taeuber-Arp began to gain substantial recognition only after the Second World War, and her work is now generally accepted as in the first rank of classical modernism. An important milestone was the exhibition of her work at documenta 1 in 1955.

In 1970, an exhibit of Taeuber-Arp's work was shown at the Albert Loeb Gallery in New York City.

Then, in 1981 the Museum of Modern Art (New York) mounted a retrospective of her work that subsequently travelled to the Museum of Contemporary Art (Chicago), the Museum of Fine Arts (Houston), Musée d'art contemporain de Montréal.

American scholar Adrian Sudhalter organized an exhibition called "Dadaglobe Reconstructed" that sought to honor the centennial of Dada's inception, along with Tzara's ambitious project. Compiling over 100 works of art that were initially slated to appear in Tristan Tzara's Dadaglobe anthology, among which are works by Taeuber-Arp, the show ran from 5 February to 1 May 2016 at the Kunsthaus Zurich, and from 12 June to 18 September 2016 at the Museum of Modern Art in New York City.

In 2020, Hauser & Wirth opened an online exhibition devoted to her work, the first in a series of international exhibitions devoted to her career.

As of July 2020, a coordinated travelling retrospective of her work is scheduled to open in March 2021 at the Kunstmuseum Basel, and then travel to the Tate Modern (15 July – 17 October) and then to the MoMA. Showing over 400 pieces, it will be the UK's first retrospective of her work, and, in America, will be the most comprehensive and her first major exhibition in the country in 40 years.

Gallery

Bibliography
 
 Sophie Taeuber-Arp 1889–1943. Catalogue of the exhibition in the Arp-Museum Bahnhof Rolandseck, at the Kunsthalle Tübingen (1993), at the Städtischen Galerie im Lenbachhaus München (1994). publisher: Siegfried Gohr, Verlag Gerd Hatje, Stuttgart, 1993. 
 Gabriele Mahn: "Sophie Taeuber-Arp", pp. 160–168, in: Karo Dame, book on the exhibition Karo Dame. Konstruktive, Konkrete und Radikale Kunst von Frauen von 1914 bis heute, Aargauer Kunsthaus Aarau, publisher: Beat Wismer, Verlag Lars Müller, Baden, 1995. 
 Christoph Vögele. Variations. Sophie Taeuber-Arp. Arbeiten auf Papier. Book on the exhibition at the Kunstmuseum Solothurn. Heidelberg: Kehrer Verlag, 2002. 
 Sophie Taeuber-Arp – Gestalterin, Architektin, Tänzerin.  Catalogue of the exhibition at the Museum Bellerive, Zürich. publisher: Hochschule für Gestaltung und Kunst Zürich. Zürich: Verlag Scheidegger & Spiess, 2007. 
 Bewegung und Gleichgewicht. Sophie Taeuber-Arp 1889–1943. Book on the exhibition at the Kirchner Museum Davos and at the Arp Museum Bahnhof Rolandseck. editor: Karin Schick, Oliver Kornhoff, Astrid von Asten. Bielefeld: Kerber Verlag, 2010. 
 Susanne Meyer-Büser: "Zwei Netzwerkerinnen der Avantgarde in Paris um 1930. Auf den Spuren von Florence Henri und Sophie Taeuber-Arp", in: Die andere Seite des Mondes. Künstlerinnen der Avantgarde. Book on the exhibition at the Kunstsammlung Nordrhein-Westfalen, Düsseldorf (ed.), and at the Louisiana Museum of Modern Art, Humlebaek, Dänemark. Köln: DuMont Buchverlag, 2011. 
 Roswitha Mair: Handwerk und Avantgarde. Das Leben der Künstlerin Sophie Taeuber-Arp. Berlin: Parthas Verlag, 2013. ; translated as 
 Sophie Taeuber-Arp – Heute ist Morgen. Comprehensive publication on the exhibition at the Aargauer Kunsthaus, Aarau, and at the Kunsthalle Bielefeld. Editor: Thomas Schmutz und Aargauer Kunsthaus, Friedrich Meschede und Kunsthalle Bielefeld. Zurich: Verlag Scheidegger & Spiess, 2014. 
 
 Schmidt, Georg, ed. (1948). Sophie Taeuber-Arp, Holbein Verlag.
 Vgele, Christoph, and Walburga Krupp (2003). Sophie Taeuber-Arp: Works on Paper, Kehrer Verlag.

References

 Taeuber-Arp collection at Museum of Modern Art
 
  Book review of  The review is of a translation of

External links
 
 
 Sophie Taeuber-Arp - 26 obras de arte - pintura
Sophie Taeuber-Arp Research Project (STARP) - a project of the Stiftung Arp e. V. (Remagen/Berlin) and the Gerhard-Marcks-Haus (Bremen)

1889 births
1943 deaths
Abstract painters
People from Davos
Swiss sculptors
20th-century Swiss painters
Dada
Swiss women painters
Academic staff of the Zurich University of the Arts
20th-century sculptors
20th-century Swiss women artists
Deaths from carbon monoxide poisoning
Swiss dadaist